Erick Luis Conrado Carvalho (born 14 November 1997), simply known as Erick, is a Brazilian footballer who currently plays as a midfielder for Athletico Paranaense.

Career statistics

Honours
Operário Ferroviário
Campeonato Paranaense Série Prata: 2018
Campeonato Brasileiro Série C: 2018

Athletico Paranaense
Campeonato Paranaense: 2019, 2020
Copa Suruga Bank: 2019
Copa do Brasil: 2019
Copa Sudamericana: 2021

References

External links

1997 births
Living people
Brazilian footballers
Association football midfielders
Campeonato Brasileiro Série A players
Campeonato Brasileiro Série C players
Campeonato Brasileiro Série D players
Paraná Soccer Technical Center players
Operário Ferroviário Esporte Clube players
Club Athletico Paranaense players